Ignatzschineria is a genus of bacteria from the class Gammaproteobacteria. Ignatzschineria is named after Ignaz Rudolph Schiner.

References

Gammaproteobacteria
Bacteria genera